Holy Cross Health fka Holy Cross Hospital is located in Fort Lauderdale, Florida. The hospital is a non-profit, 557-bed Catholic hospital which operates in the spirit of the Sisters of Mercy. It is a member of Trinity Health.

Founded in 1955, Holy Cross has received honors for its patient safety, orthopedics, urology, gynecology, women's health, geriatric, stroke care, heart failure, chronic obstructive pulmonary disease (COPD) and heart bypass surgery.

A full-service, acute care hospital, Holy Cross is home to the Jim Moran Heart and Vascular Center, Jim Moran Heart and Vascular Research Institute, Michael & Dianne Bienes Comprehensive Cancer Center, Rehabilitation Institute, Harry T. Mangurian, Jr. Diagnostic Imaging Center, Zachariah Family Wellness Pavilion and the Feldman Center for Optimal Health. Its satellite locations include the Orthopedic Institute, Orthopedic Research Institute Dorothy Mangurian Comprehensive Women's Center, Urgent Care and Imaging Centers, HealthPlex, Holy Cross Medical Group offices and outpatient rehabilitation services.

History 
Operating in the spirit of the Sisters of Mercy, the hospital opened in 1955 to serve the sick and injured without regard to race, religion or nationality.

References

External links
 Holy Cross, Fort lauderdale Official site

Buildings and structures in Fort Lauderdale, Florida
Catholic hospitals in North America
Hospitals established in 1955
Hospitals in Florida
1955 establishments in Florida